Cristina de Middel (born 1975) is a Spanish documentary photographer and artist living and working in Uruapan, Mexico.

De Middel self-published The Afronauts in 2012, a photobook about the short-lived Zambian space program in Southern Africa. The book quickly sold out and the work was met with critical acclaim. She was nominated for the 2013 Deutsche Börse Photography Prize for The Afronauts.

In 2013, de Middel received the Infinity Award from the International Center of Photography. In 2017 she became a nominee member of Magnum Photos and in 2022 became a full member.

Exhibitions 
Polyspam Vevey, 2009

The Afronauts

 Foam, Amsterdam, 2013

 Fotografía Europea, Reggio Emilia, Italy, 2013
 Deutsche Börse Prize, London, 2013
 Dong Gang International Photo Festival Corea, 2013
 Paraty em Foco IX Paraty, Brazil, 2013
 Photo Ireland, Dublin, Ireland, 2013

Not All Documents Are Records, Liverpool Biennial, Liverpool, UK, 2014

Close Enough: New Perspectives from 12 Women Photographers of Magnum, International Center of Photography, 2022

Publications

Publications by de Middel
 The Afronauts. London: Self-published, 2012. . Edition of 1000 copies.
Second edition. Bilbao, Spain: This Book Is True, 2016. Edition of 1500 copies.
 Vida Y Milagros de Paula P (Life and Miracles of Paula P). Alicante, Spain: Museo de la Universidad de Alicante, 2009. Edition of 500 copies. Spanish. Early work featuring the "real story of a fake prostitute" Paula P.
 SPBH Book Club Vol III. London: Self Publish, Be Happy, 2013. Edition of 500 copies. .
 Party: Quotations from Chairman Mao Tse-tung. Madrid: RM; London: Archive of Modern Conflict, 2013. . Edition of 1500 copies.
Afronauts. Zine Collection 12. Paris: Edition Bessard, 2014. . Edition of 300 copies.
This is What Hatred Did. Mexico; Barcelona: RM Editorial / London: Archive of Modern Conflict, 2015. . With text by Amos Tutuola, "My Life in the Bush of Ghosts".
Sharkification. São Paulo, Brazil: Editora Madalena, 2015. . Edition of 100 copies.
Man Jayen. Pamplona, Spain: Trama, 2015. . Catalogue of an exhibition held at the Museum of the University of Navarra. Edition of 1000 copies.
Cucurrucucu. Bilbao, Spain: This Book Is True; self-published, 2016. . With a text by Cuauhtémoc Medina.

Publications about de Middel
Cristina de Middel. Colleción PHotoBolsillo. Madrid: La Fábrica, 2015. .

Awards
 Infinity Award, International Center of Photography, 2013.
Party: Quotations from Chairman Mao Tse-tung won PhotoEspaña's Best Photography Book, international category award, 2014.

References

External links
 

Living people
Spanish photographers
Spanish women photographers
1975 births
Documentary photographers
Artists from London
Magnum photographers
Women photojournalists